Angela Marie Dotchin (born 31 March 1974 in Auckland) is a former actress best most known for her roles as Kirsty Knight in Shortland Street, and as Emilia Rothschild in Jack of All Trades and for starring as Kora on Young Hercules.

Personal life
Dotchin was born on 31 March 1974. Her father is a businessman of Welsh ancestry, with whom she travelled extensively, before the family returned to New Zealand in 1985. Dotchin also has an older sister. She attended Meadowbank Primary, in Meadowbank, Auckland and Selwyn College, in Kohimarama, Auckland.

Dotchin was in a relationship with New Zealander actor, Temuera Morrison for six years.

Career
In 1990, at the age of sixteen, Dotchin began modelling. Her first audition was for the role of Kirsty Knight in the long-running soap opera Shortland Street. At the time, Shortland Street was a private hospital, and Kirsty was one of the two receptionists. Later she moved 'upstairs', where she became PA to the clinic's medical director.

North American audiences were introduced to Angela by her roles in the Hercules: The Legendary Journeys and Xena: Warrior Princess series, as well as the Hercules spin-off show Young Hercules. Her popularity from these roles helped her land a starring role opposite Bruce Campbell in the short-lived television series Jack of All Trades.

Subsequently, she has appeared as Auckland private investigator Jodie Keane in a trilogy of made-for-TV thrillers: Lawless, Lawless: Dead Evidence and Lawless: Beyond Justice.

Dotchin moved to the United Kingdom in 2002, and currently works as a personal assistant in the fashion industry.

Filmography

Awards

Wins
1999 New Zealand Television Award, for Lawless

Nominations
1997 NZ Film and Television Awards, for Shortland Street
1994 NZ Film and Television Awards, for Shortland Street

References

External links

New Zealand television actresses
1974 births
Living people
New Zealand people of Welsh descent
New Zealand soap opera actresses
People educated at Selwyn College, Auckland
20th-century New Zealand actresses
21st-century New Zealand actresses